Sumenep Town (Indonesian: Kota Sumenep, Madurese: Koṭṭa Songennep; Pronunciation [kɔʈʈah ’sɔŋǝnnǝp], Pèghu: كوتا سَوڠٓنّٓڤ, Carakan: ꦏꦺꦴꦠ꧀ꦠꦯꦺꦴꦔꦼꦤ꧀ꦤꦼꦥ꧀, Lontara': ᨀᨚᨈ ᨔᨚᨂᨛᨊᨛ) is a town on Madura Island in Indonesia; it is the administrative capital of Sumenep Regency, in East Java Province. Hugely prosperous in the eighteenth century, it is now a quiet, peaceful backwater, with its past glory still in evidence.

Climate
Sumenep has a tropical savanna climate (Aw) with May to November and heavy rainfall from December to April.

References

Populated places in East Java
Madura Island